The four-frequency of a massless particle, such as a photon, is a four-vector defined by 

The four-frequency of a photon is always a future-pointing and null vector. An observer moving with four-velocity  will observe a frequency

Where  is the Minkowski inner-product (+−−−)

Closely related to the four-frequency is the four-wavevector defined by

The four-wavevector is more often used in practice than the four-frequency, but the two vectors are related (using ) by

See also
 Four-vector
 Wave vector

References

Four-vectors